In The Valley, On The Shores is a solo EP released by Jim Ward. It is the second time he released a solo EP, and is the second out of the three EP's in his acoustic EP trilogy. It was released May 1, 2009 by Ward's Civil Defense League record label. The EP also features Tegan Quin, from the band Tegan and Sara, who sings harmony on the second track "Broken Songs". Only 500 copies of the physical CD were made. The CD's were all hand numbered.

Track listing
All songs written by Jim Ward except "The Newest One" which was written with Gabe Gonzalez

Personnel
Jim Ward - Guitar, vocals
Greg Sosa - Bass
Tegan Quin - Sang on "Broken Songs"
Armando Alvarez - Design & Layout of CD

References

2009 EPs